North Decatur Junior-Senior High School is a middle school and high school located in Greensburg, Indiana.

Athletics
While the majority of sports at North Decatur Junior-Senior High School compete in the Mid-Hoosier Conference, the football program competes in the Mid-Indiana Football Conference.

See also
 List of high schools in Indiana
 South Decatur Junior-Senior High School
 Mid-Hoosier Conference
 Mid-Indiana Football Conference
 Greensburg, Indiana

References

External links
Official Website

Public high schools in Indiana
Buildings and structures in Decatur County, Indiana
1967 establishments in Indiana